William Andrew "Andy" Beckstoffer is a California vineyard owner, with holdings in Napa, Lake County, and Mendocino.

Biography

Beckstoffer was a resident of Richmond, Virginia, and went to Virginia Tech on a football scholarship. He graduated with an Engineering degree, and served in the United States Army. While in the Army, he learned about the California wine industry in San Francisco. Upon leaving the Army, he entered graduate school at Dartmouth, earning a Master of Business Administration in 1966, and went to work for a finance company, Hueblein Inc. He convinced the company to invest in the burgeoning wine industry.

Influence on the California wine industry

Beckstoffer was involved in settling a labor dispute led by Cesar Chavez in the late 1960s and early 1970s. His vineyard management practices, including decisions regarding vine spacing and irrigation, have helped to modernize the California wine industry. Additionally, he has been active in the definition of the Rutherford and Saint Helena AVAs.

References

Living people
American viticulturists
Businesspeople from Richmond, Virginia
Virginia Tech alumni
Virginia Tech Hokies football players
Tuck School of Business alumni
United States Army soldiers
Wineries in Napa Valley
Labor disputes in California
Labor disputes in the United States
Year of birth missing (living people)